Mount Homard is a mountain  high, near the head of Blaiklock Glacier,  south of the Trey Peaks in the western part of the Shackleton Range, Antarctica. It was first mapped in 1957 by the Commonwealth Trans-Antarctic Expedition and was named for Sergeant Major Desmond E.L. Homard, an engineer with the advance and transpolar parties of the expedition, 1955–58.

References

Mountains of Coats Land